Yin Yang Yo! is a Flash animated television series created by Bob Boyle for Jetix. Produced by Jetix Animation Concepts as the third Jetix original series, it first aired on August 26, 2006, as a sneak peek and premiered on September 4, 2006, in the United States. The show debuted on Jetix in the United Kingdom on February 5, 2007, after a sneak peek preview on January 27, 2007, while making its Canadian television premiere on Family Channel on March 25, 2007. The series is supplied with writers and animators' staff associated with The Fairly OddParents, 6teen, Clone High, Wow! Wow! Wubbzy! and Danny Phantom. Head writer Steve Marmel, an anime fan, took an inspiration from various anime like FLCL and anime-influenced shows such as Teen Titans. The series centers on two anthropomorphic twin rabbits named Yin and Yang, and their sensei-like panda figure named Yo, a master of fictional mystical martial arts called Woo Foo.

During 2007, this show was nominated for British Academy Children's Award by the BAFTA in the International category, but lost to Nickelodeon's SpongeBob SquarePants. From its launch on June 1, 2011, to late 2012, Disney XD Canada aired reruns of the series.

Premise
The show is about two 11-year-old rabbits named Yin and Yang who train under Master Yo, a grumpy old panda. They learn the sacred art of Woo Foo, a special type of martial arts that involves both might and magic. They must work together to defeat evil villains and forces movitivated on destroying, corrupt or dominate society.

During the first season, the primary goal was to defeat the Night Master, a powerful enemy. During the second season, there are three primary storylines. The first one sees Yin and Yang trying to prevent other villains from being crowned the new Night Master. The second is Yang's own quest to find powerful mystic artifacts by some later-revealed-to-be villains: four evil heads who he thinks are the masters of Woo Foo. The third sees Yin and Yang against the original and reborn Night Master Eradicus — ultimately trying to build a Woo Foo army to fight against his army.

Setting
The setting is in a town where its buildings have an Asian style. The residents are monsters, humanoids, robots and animals with human-like qualities and behaviors. The residents keep unusual pets like puppygriffs (creatures that are half puppy and half eagle) and two-ni-corns (a race of two-horned unicorns), as well as real animals like dogs, cats, opossums or armadillos. Magic and martial arts still exist since ancient times when the Night Masters were around. It is revealed in "Yin Yang You!", that the series takes place in another dimension.

Episodes

Yin Yang Yo! premiered on Jetix on September 4, 2006, and the first season has been completed with 26 episodes, including the three parts to "Woofoogeddon". In January 2007, Jetix ordered a second season of Yin Yang Yo! with 26 episodes planned. The second season premiered on New Year's Day 2008, with 13 additional episodes.

Characters

Main

 Yin (voiced by Stephanie Morgenstern) - Master Yo's student and the younger twin sister of Yang. Yin is pictured as intelligent, cute, feminine and sassy. She mostly uses the Mystic side of Woo Foo, but she is also able to use the Martial Arts side of Woo Foo. She is often quite stubborn, and shows that she loves a tidy house and clean environment. Yin generally has a good sense of right and wrong, and usually does the right thing. It has been shown, mostly in season two, that she favors "bad boys", but she has said it was just a phase. Yin's favorite color is pink (just like she is), and her favorite animal is a "two-nicorn" (a unicorn with two horns instead of one). Yin loves to sing, and is apparently very good at it. She is also a shopaholic. Unlike Yang, she always makes sure to let her twin and master Yo know that she cares for them a lot. In the episode "Night Fall," upon discovering Coop was working for the Night Master, gained an attraction to him. It was because of this personality trait that she temporarily became evil through Coop's influence in "Gone-A-Fowl", and went on a rampage across town with him to prove that she was evil enough to be the Night Mistress (with him as the Night Master). Before she and her brother Yang were adopted by Master Yo, they were street urchins and waifs.
 Yang (voiced by Scott McCord) - Master Yo's student and the older twin brother of Yin. He mostly uses the Martial Arts side of Woo Foo, but is able to use the Mystic side of Woo Foo as well. Yang is a very lucky, courageous yet negligent and hasty character, and has a liking for clowns, fights, video games and often seeks attention as a hero. Despite not showing emotions towards his sister, he really cares about his sister and Master Yo's well-being, and it is shown in the episode "My Stupid Sword" that Yang pushed Yin out of the way so Yin would not get in trouble by Master Yo when Yang's negligence caused looting of Woo Foo Armory by Chung Pow Kitties. Yang owns a bamboo-based sword which can temporally transform into various objects, using Woo Foo. He has a crush on Yin's friend Lina and frequently tries to impress her. He also unintentionally helped Eradicus to return from eternal slumber, using magical and spiritual items collected by Yang on a quest added by Eradicus minions posing as Woo Foo elders' spirits. However, Yin, Yang and Yo were able to defeat him. In the episode "A Toy's Story" it is revealed that he is 11 years old.
 Master Yo (voiced by Martin Roach) - A bachelor panda with a hundred years of age but with zero parenting skills and the skillful master of ancient martial arts known as Woo Foo. He was talked into training Yin and Yang, as he is the last Woo Foo warrior (and perhaps the last panda) in the world. He is often portrayed as arrogant, stubborn, indifferent yet bears great sage wisdom and is often quick with a saying from sacred scrolls. He's able to use both might and magic and has moves that Yin and Yang are unaware of. He once was able to defeat the Night Master. He is shown to be on a quest for a younger spouse of sorts as he is often seen trying to pick up women, especially single mothers, though he is unsuccessful. He also became romantically involved with Carl the Evil Cockroach Wizard's mother Edna, and three unnamed ex-girlfriends who later kidnapped him because he stopped seeing them. In "Slumber Party of Doom", it is shown that he lives a double-life as the crime-fighting vigilante Possum Panda (a parody of Batman), used as a pretext to avoid his parenting duties. His alter-ego returns in "The Secret Life of Possum Panda", however due to having forgotten he is Possum Panda, he starts fighting crime in his sleep as Possum Panda. It is revealed later in the series that he is the biological father of Yin and Yang, thus making them half-Panda. Yin and Yang's biological mother is never seen or mentioned and no explanation is given for her absence.

Villains
 The Night Master (voiced by David Hemblen) – Billed as a "Dark Overlord in an Evil Class All By Himself", the Night Master is a very powerful and dangerous foe who was responsible for the near extinction of Woo Foo by eliminating all of the Woo Foo knights except for Master Yo. He tricked the world into thinking Woo Foo is dumb and giving it a bad reputation to prevent anyone from learning it to be use against him. The Sensei managed to turn Night Master's army to stone and sent him into hiding for a hundred years until he tricked Yin and Yang into using Woo Foo in order to free his army. The Night Master appears to be a demonic sorcerer bat (as such, he hates light) of some description and has a liking for "gothically" ostentatious outfits. The Night Master is very intelligent, though his plans typically fail because of the stupidity of his minions and his own ego gets the better of him causing him to underestimate his enemies. Another reason of his downfall was because if he had killed Yin and Yang at the start, he feared that Yo would train another group of Woo Foo warriors that would be more competent than the two and he was waiting for the right moment to kill them and Yo at the same time. He is considered to be the actual main villain throughout the series, even though Carl appeared in most of the episodes, while Carl was the main villain since the first season. As revealed in "The Pecking Order", he is one of an eternal line of Night Masters alongside Eradicus and an unnamed cobra-like woman. His real name (since "Night Master" is a title) has not yet been revealed. Ever since his defeat, the other villains have been developing their evil in an attempt to become the new Night Master. Also since his defeat, the reputation of Woo Foo is slowly recovering. It is stated that if the series had a season 3, Woo Foo would have many Woo Foo students and thus completely undid the Night Master's years of planning. Night Master's appearance is similar to Aku of Samurai Jack fame and Hades from Hercules.
 Grizzleflavin (voiced by Jonathan Wilson) - The gargoyle head that is located at the entrance of Night Masters' lair. He allows anyone that is evil to enter the Night Master's Lair.
 Dank & Dire (voiced by Damon Papadopoulos) – Two dark creatures that are the Night Master's minions.
 Carl the Evil Cockroach Wizard (voiced by Jamie Watson) - A flamboyant cockroach wizard, who frequently seeks an approval of his overbearing dragon-like mother who heavily berates him. He continuously schemes to defeat Yin, Yang, Master Yo and the power of the Woo Foo with his insecure genius. Carl is always trying to find a way to impress his mother and out-do his sadistic, selfish brother Herman. Even though Carl and Herman dislike one another, they have worked together on occasion, making a deadly force against Yin and Yang. His dream was to become so enormous that he would blot out the sun, an idea that Herman and the Night Master stole. Carl is an anti-thesis to Yin's magical ability and Yang's goofiness. Carl is stronger than Yin and Yang in power, but if someone criticizes him, he's easily distracted. It is revealed in "Yin Yang Carl" that he could defeat Herman in a fight, if only he used his magic powers. He has an entry on a dating site. In the episode "Creeping with the Enemy", Carl is the only villain not recruited into Eradicus' company/secret army Eradicorp because according to his mother, cockroaches working in a coffee shop would not do well for the business.
 Eradicus (voiced by Jonathan Wilson) - A mighty Gryphon who is bent on destroying Woo Foo. As revealed in "Welcome To The Dark Tomorrow," he is in fact the first and original Night Master. After his demise (of unknown cause), other beings of darkness took on the mantle of evil he left behind including an unknown snake lady and the bat-creature Yin and Yang faced in season 1. His deceased minions posed as the ghosts of the Woo Foo Elders to manipulate Yang into collecting the items of power needed to revive him. Tricking Yang into throwing the items into the Night Master's fireplace at the stroke of midnight, Eradicus was instantly resurrected. Upon his revival, Eradicus revived his minions and started the Dark Tomorrow (turning everyone good evil and everyone evil good). With the combined abilities of Yin, Yang (empowered with the items given to him by the League of Evil), and Yo, Eradicus was defeated and the Dark Tomorrow was reversed. Despite the destruction of the Night Master's lair during the battle, Eradicus was revealed to still be alive in "The Howl Of The Weenie", where he still plans the destruction of the Woo Foo. In "Creeping With the Enemy," he has established Eradicorp, where most of the villain community is working. He appears as the final boss in the online game Dangerous Comic Book of Dread.
 Ella Mental (voiced by Linda Ballantyne) - A female minion of Eradicus who is a mind reader.
 Rubber Chucky (voiced by Peter Cugmo) - A tall minion of Eradicus has elastic, shapeshifting body.
 Indestructo-Bob (voiced by Tony Daniels) - A slow-witted minion of Eradicus who has indestructible armor.
 Mollecu-Lars (voiced by David Berni in a German accent) - A small octopus-like minion of Eradicus who can manipulate his molecules to shapeshift, levitate, and regenerate his limbs.
 Brother Herman (voiced by David Berni) - Carl's black hearted, sadistic, selfish and evil ant brother, Herman, is a tyrannical ant warlord who rules his kingdom with an iron fist, a diabolical mind, and impeccable table manners. He attempted to take over the world until Master Yo stopped him, due to him being allergic to pandas.
 Charles – Herman's second-in-command.
 Ultimoose (voiced by Tony Daniels) - An athletic daredevil moose-like creature with his very own branch of martial arts and originally the Night Master affiliate. He can be described as sexist, masculine, selfish and aggressive yet also obsessive, paranoid in the spirit of Denzel Crocker from Fairly OddParents while being perceived by other characters as miserable buffoon. He tends to refer to himself in the third person. His outfit and hairstyle are similar to that of the Marvel Comics superhero Wonder Man. He became the new Night Master in "Deja Foo", calling himself the Night Mooster. He became regular Ultimoose again after Yang reversed time, found the Night Master's Amnesulet first, and was aided by the other villains to defeat him. He also collects Yang's hair as revealed in "Yin Yang Who?".
 Smoke (voiced by Linda Ballantyne) - A hyper-active female with more distinctively anime-like eyes who was, supposedly, Yang's girlfriend until it was revealed to be an elaborate plot for the completion of her quest. Yin and Yang eventually capture the two into Smoke's Prison Prism (spoof of Poké-balls from Pokémon). She reappears in "League of Evil" as a member of the league alongside Carl, Pondscüm, and The Puffin. She shows an interest in bathroom tidiness and also activities such as serenity trances and East Asian-based meditation in general. Her weapon of choice is a gigantic sword that highly resembles the buster sword used by Cloud Strife in Final Fantasy VII. Her style and choice of clothing parodies Sailor Moon (of whom her voice actress voiced in the American dubs of the anime). She also seems to talk really fast and out of sync with her lip movements, further spoofing Japanese animation's voice actors.
 Mirrors (voiced by Jonathan Wilson) - Smoke's rivaled brother. When Smoke uses Yang in the battle tournament, Mirrors obtains Yin to fight her. Yin and Yang managed to use one of the Forever Friend Prisms to imprison Smoke and Mirrors. Mirrors' hairstyle resembles the hairstyle of Goku from Dragon Ball Z and his interest in roses (exploding roses, to be exact) parodies James from the Pokémon series. He appears to speak in a way mocking most Japanese voice actors, by stopping and starting at odd intervals. He and his sister's names are a play on words of the metaphor smoke and mirrors. He and Smoke are shown to have formed a rapport in order to bring Yin and Yang down together, however it doesn't last long as they begin fighting again.
 Yuck (voiced by Scott McCord) - A turquoise-green slovenly rabbit, is an entity formed from Yin's obsession with control and Yang's aggression. As a repulsive, mutant rabbit, Yuck wants more than anything in the world to be the greatest, most powerful Woo Foo Knight of all time. After he lost his physical form, he was found by the Night Master who built him a robot suit with hands that absorb Woo Foo so he could become real. He dated Yin in disguise and eventually absorbed enough energy to regain his physical form, becoming his own individual being. Yuck has shown himself to be quite intelligent in his convoluted schemes to Yin and Yang. In terms of fighting ability he appears to be as formidable as Yin and Yang put together, being able to take on Yo himself. After a mission into Yo to get an ancient Woo Foo weapon, Yin and Yang break his shrink belt and he shrinks uncontrollably to the point where he is no longer visible. However, he returns a Level 2 Woo Foo Knight when the 2 copies of Yin and Yang copies misuse their "fooplication" charm. He is a Level 2 Woo Foo Knight due to Yin and Yang's title of Level 1 Woo Foo Knights, thus he can use the same moves as both Yin and Yang. Using the charm, Yuck created an army of Yin and Yang "fooplicates". When Yin destroys the charm to erase the "fooplicates", Yuck absorbs their power and becomes Master Yo's level if not more. Unfortunately for Yuck, he also develops a bad case of the hiccups which leaves him unable to control his new powers. He appears to have the power to possess creatures now as well, as he possessed the Headmaster of 'Camp Magic-Pants'. He later returned, cleaned up and trying to be good, saying that a mysterious monk reformed him. His actions were truly noble until the acts of Yin and Yang, who still didn't trust him, prompted Yuck to return to being evil, as he believed Yin and Yang to want all their worst qualities on display to make them look good.
 Zarnot (voiced by Jamie Watson) – Once Yang's favorite toy, Zarnot is an evil action figure brought to life by the Lie Fairy and later recruited by the Night Master. Due to his common failure, Zarnot was forced into a hated toy box by the Night Master. With the Night Master defeated, Zarnot's status was unknown until "Deja Foo."
 Pondscüm (voiced by Jonathan Wilson) - Pondscüm, is a street, Swedish, fish inside a robot suit. He is obsessed with "bling-bling", and will get it at all costs. However, he truly carries a Swedish accent. In "Fighting Fooberty," it is revealed that he is a pollywog.
 The Blixens - Lexoll and Velveema are Pondscüm's female android henchmen. In "Fighting Fooberty," they leave Pondscüm when he turns out to not by a fish but a pollywog. They later returned to him where they have made a new terrarium-type robot suit for him.
 Fastidious James Spiffington (voiced by Mark Bowen in a British accent) - A small hamster obsessed with cleanliness and world domination. He is nearly always seen inside a hamster ball that serves as the control center for his robots, mainly his Hamsterbot. Fastidious seems to be a certified attorney.
 Saranoia (voiced by Linda Ballantyne) - A powerful sorceress and mistress of disguise. She had a difficult childhood with her father and her lazy brother Mark, which led her to establish strong women's empowerment and feminist views and values. Due to the nature of her obsessive-compulsive behavior and delusional behavior, Saranoia's goal is to terminate Yang's masculine influence on Yin, and also terminate Yang's existence altogether, while heavily pursuing Yin into education. She also mistakes Master Yo as her boy-favoring wizard father, just as she mistakes Yang for Mark. She was condemned to an insane asylum from "The Truth Hurts" to "A Bad Case of the Buglies." Yin and Yang filed a restraining order on her. At this point, she's given up being an evil wizard, has had plastic surgery, and is the spokesperson for Repulsix. When Saranoia takes one of her wands, she takes on a set of characteristics and must abide by the rules of the wand, even if it is against her own will.
 "G.P." (voiced by Damon Papadopoulos impersonating Burt Reynolds) - A talking gnome-like assistant who is generally reasonable yet indifferent, bland and allows himself to comply in accordance to his boss needs. G.P.'s solo, dark, and aggressive side's debut is in "Party Favors" when he teams up with Flavior and Charles for his own personal gain of crashing Coop's "Welcome Back and Thanks For Saving Everyone From Evil By Banishing The Night Master All By Yourself" party to enter The Night Master's lair with Coop's spare key. He later changes his name to Fr-Ped which is short for "Frightenengly Really Powerful Enraged Doombringer" where he pronounces it as "Fred" with the P being silent.
 The Chung Pow Kitties (voiced by Stephanie Morgenstern) - A trio of small, furry and adorable kittens who closely resemble characters Blossom, Bubbles and Buttercup from The Powerpuff Girls, but they are generally heartless, antagonistic ninjas and enemies of Yin and Yang. They usually wear dresses pink, purple and green. They only speak in meows, although they have been known to use translators to speak in English when in disguise.
 Kraggler (voiced by Tony Daniels) – A gargoyle who is about a "bazillion" years old, Kraggler used to be a great and powerful warrior and Master Yo's arch enemy until he became too old to fight. After he broke the time traveling hour glass he got the power to drain the youth from anything, or give his age to anything.
 Roger the Skelewog (voiced by Jonathan Wilson) - A vicious warrior who is a part-time villain of Yin and Yang. He is the father of Roger Skelewog Jr.
 The Puffin (voiced by Jim Belushi) - A gentleman-dressed puffin. When Yin and Yang start to mistake him for a penguin, Carl cuts them off by stating he's a puffin and that they "can't be sued for a puffin". Puffin is said to had a big advantage in the rain which hasn't been demonstrated. He is a parody of Penguin.
 Mastermind (voiced by Peter Cugno) - An evil mittens-wearing wizard who was a big threat years ago. Now he's just a brain in a skull and mittens looking for a body to regain his reign of evil.
 Badfoot (voiced by Orlando Jones) is a purple horse who was known as the enemy that Master Yo couldn't beat, appearing only in the episodes "Old Softie" and "The Big Payback". He is supported by his horn section, he dresses like James Brown, and used to carry with him a power item called the Lick-n-Stick. Once a year every year, he come into the city to drain Woo Foo out of Master Yo. When Yin and Yang "fought the funk (even though they had to use it their way)", they managed to aid Master Yo in defeating Badfoot at last, claiming the Lick-n-Stick in the process.
 The Manotaur (voiced by Seth MacFarlane) - A masculine character with hairy hooves and macho aesthetics. He is a large man with a bald head who dresses like a city man. His plan was to kidnap all the Two-ni-corns and to shave off all their hair to make a large wig to cover up his really smooth, bald head to get a date with The Womanotaur. When Yin and Yang reach his lair, it is really his house in a cul-de-sac, Yang uses Man Smash, learned from his comic book hero, U-Dude, and frees the Two-ni-corns. It is revealed throughout the entire episode that he is the only character in the series with five-fingers (noted by his pinky wearing a pinky ring) He later appears to challenge Yin and Yang to a lifesized board game to win the dojo, whom Master Yo wasn't able to pay the bills Yin and Yang threw away.
 Ranger Ron - A condescending illiterate park ranger with the physical appearance of pig who only appears in the episode "Today You Are a Bear" (season 02, episode 24), where Yin and Yang come to Vincent von Growl's so-called Bear mitzvah. He's openly expressing unreasonable hate and malice against bears, whom he wants to discredit and cause injury to due to various reasons like a bear being his supervisor, one bear "mauling" him while he was the movie theater, bears making go to a 12 item check out when he had 13 items in his cart. Ranger Ron then pranks Yin and Yang after their desire to become Bear mitzvah'd remains unfulfilled. With help from Master Yo and the bear ranger that was Ranger Ron's supervisor, Yin and Yang were able to defeat Ranger Ron.

Allies
 Coop (voiced by Jonathan Wilson) - A nerdy, shy chicken with a huge crush on Yin. Due to his resentment and Yin's rejection, he joined the Night Master in exchange for the promise to have Yin when the world was taken over. He's presented as a minor villain later in the series where he had powers and abilities rivaling Yin and Yang's. As he turned his back on Night Master and helped Yin and Yang to defeat the Night Master, he completely disappeared from the show, later returning in "The Pecking Order". He was stripped of his Night Master energy that spread across the world, possessing all who ingest it until Coop absorbs a large amount of controlled evil, enough to make him a Night Master. Coop can also enter the Night Master's lair whenever he wants. He has the ability to create a glowing orange-yellow, bird shaped battle aura, which he dubs "Shadow Chicken." While using it, he is powerful enough to defeat even Master Yo. In "Gone-A-Fowl" he starts to lose control of his evil, causing him to become a buff, shades wearing, bad boy version of himself whenever he gets frustrated, reverting to his dorky self when made happy. In this form, he gains the ability to infect others with his evil, causing them to become powered up evil versions of themselves. Before the final battle with Eradicus took place, Coop decided to join the Yin and Yang's Woo Foo Army to fight Eradicus.
 Lina (voiced by Novie Edwards) - An aqua-green female dog, Lina is Yang's not-quite-yet girlfriend and crush and Yin's best friend. She is a nice, carefree, confident yet short-tempered girl who lives on a farm with her father. She was first introduced in "Beetlemania", when Yang pretended to be a Woo Foo Warrior in order to impress her, but his plan backfired after he had to fight a giant steel beetle. In "The Yin of Yang", Lina showed some feelings for Yang after he tried to act like Yin in order to get more of her attention. In "Smoke and Mirrors", she actually tried to pursue him, though her attempts were frequently disrupted by Yin. In the episode "Yin Yang You!", it is finally revealed that her species is in fact a dog, though it was believed beforehand that she was a bear. In the episode "Gone-A-Fowl", she and Yang exchange their secret feelings for each other, and begin pursuing a relationship.
 Roger Skelewog Jr. (voiced by Dwayne Hill) - The son of Yin and Yang's part-time enemy, Roger the Skelewog. At first, Roger Jr. was a bully to Yin and Yang, having mock fights with Yang and teasing him and Yin, but, during "Woofoogeddon", it was revealed he longed to be Yang's best friend. Roger Jr., being a prehistoric-esque monster, has displayed super strength, such as when he easily took out a whole group of the Night Master's soldiers just by running by them with his arms. He can also breathe fire and launch spikes from his arms. In Season 2, he ultimately becomes friends with Yin, Yang and Lina.
 Dave (voiced by Dwayne Hill) - A magical talking tree stump, Dave is a low-life and is considered pathetic by his friends. Many times, Dave is often caught in the crossfire of battles or hurt in some way by friend and/or foe. He is also whiny, talks nonstop about his family of trees, and is never noticed. As discovered in "Stuck", Dave has the ability to communicate with and manipulate plants. This apparently surpasses that of the other characters.
 The Boogeyman - A disco-loving green monster and a friend from Yin and Yang.
 Jobeaux (voiced by Bill Engvall) - A Redneckistanian practicing Woo Foo, while being disliked by his teachers, Yin and Yang, as a stupid, smelly hick. He has a pet armadillo named Fuzzy Thunder that hides in his mouth, giving him a hick accent.
 Melodia (voiced by Megan Fahlenbock) - A yellow-green aardvark who is the princess of the Stink Aardvarks. She is in love with Yang for his filthy ways, and despises all things clean.
 RainbowMane (voiced by Hadley Kay) - The majestic leader of the Two-ni-corns.

Cast
 Stephanie Morgenstern – Yin, Chung Pow Kitties
 Scott McCord – Yang, Yuck
 Martin Roach – Master Yo
 Jamie Watson – Carl the Evil Cockroach Wizard, Zarnot
 Tony Daniels – Kraggler, Ultimoose, Indestructo-Bob
 Dwayne Hill – Dave, F. L. Smelfman
 Novie Edwards – Lina, Girlbotica
 Linda Ballantyne – Smoke, Saranoia, Ella Mental
 David Hemblen – Night Master
 Jonathan Wilson – Coop, Roger the Skelewog, Eradicus, Mirrors
 Megan Fahlenbock – Melodia
 David Berni – Brother Herman, Molecu-Lars
 Jennifer Coolidge – Coop's Mother
 Jim Belushi – The Puffin
 Hadley Kay – Rainbow Mane
 Bill Engvall – Jobeaux
 Kathleen Laskey – Edna, Lie Fairy
 Seth MacFarlane – Manotaur
 Orlando Jones – Badfoot
 Nancy O'Dell – Nancy O. Delffa
 Mark Bowen – Fastidious James Spiffington

Guest stars
 Kyle Massey
 Jason Earles
 Mitchel Musso

Production

The series was created by Bob Boyle, an animator and storyboard artist previously working on Nickelodeon projects such as The Fairly OddParents and Danny Phantom. Influenced by his frequent trips to Little Tokyo, Los Angeles, Bob developed the pilot for the series when his then-previous series Wow! Wow! Wubbzy! was in production. Once the series got the green-light, Bob initially worked simultaneously on development for the first season of both shows. Steve Marmel, a stand-up comedian and also a writer for The Fairly OddParents and Danny Phantom, who has known Boyle for years, was offered a long-term contract from Disney/Jetix to participate on the project upon request by Boyle, who needed assistance on producing the show due to scheduling conflicts. Marmel, who would later create Sonny with a Chance and So Random!, drew influence from anime shows such as Gainax-produced FLCL, putting American anime-influenced animated shows like Teen Titans and Samurai Jack in the mix, using it as driving force to deliver comedy. Although a show directed at general audiences, especially children over 6 years old, with its mildly risqué innuendos it also targets adults as well.

John Fountain (who participated in Fairly OddParents, My Life as a Teenage Robot) was brought on board as a series director for the initial first season when his work for My Life as a Teenage Robot was concluding. Fountain worked closely with Marmel and Boyle on developing the lore of the show, and occasionally assisted in storyboarding the first episode, writing and co-voice directing with Marmel. Eric Trueheart (Invader Zim) also assisted in writing scripts and co-voice directing with Marmel during the second season. 

For cost efficiency due to the small budget and crew the series had, the majority of pre-production for the series—including animation, voice recording, and storyboarding—was done in Toronto. The majority of the character design direction was done by Mark Thornton and Todd Kaufman (co-creators of Grojband and Looped, and character designers for Total Drama). The animation for the show was provided by Elliott Animation, a Canadian animation studio previously working on the Teletoon's 6teen. A different group of animators, who work on revisions and interstitials, come from the Disney campus of Burbank in California, United States and Frederator Studios, producer of many Nickelodeon titles. As it's an American co-production by Disney, many actors that worked in Disney productions such as Kyle Massey, Jason Earles and Mitchel Musso guest starred as voice actors in the series.

The music for the show was provided by Michael Tavera, who also created music for Time Squad and ¡Mucha Lucha!, while the theme song was written by Bob Boyle and Guy Moon (composer for Fairly OddParents and Danny Phantom), produced by Moon and performed by Kyle Massey. Many episodes of Yin Yang Yo! were directed by Fountain, Mark Ackland (a director of Clone High), Ted Collyer (also director of Clone High), and Chad Hicks (also director of Total Drama, and storyboard artist for Courage the Cowardly Dog). At the same time, the main established writing force was Steve Marmel (also executive producer) with the help of Trueheart, Aydrea ten Bosch (ChalkZone), Sib Ventress (Danny Phantom). Chris Romano and Eric Falconer, responsible for Spike's Blue Mountain State, and production of How I Met Your Mother and The Sarah Silverman Program, also participated on the writing of various episodes. Staff writers Evan Gore & Heather Lombard who penned Futuramas episode "Fear of a Bot Planet" (1ACV05) and The Adventures of Jimmy Neutron, Boy Geniuss episodes "Krunch Time" and "Brobot", lately dedicated their work for Lilo & Stitch: The Series, participated in the creative process of Yin Yang Yo! as well. As the series went on, Bart Jennett (Recess) became a producer and writer on the series, with many other freelance writers joining like Danielle Koenig and Rob Hummel (Invader Zim), Dave Newman and Joe Liss (Drawn Together and SpongeBob SquarePants), Amy Wolfram (Teen Titans and Xiaolin Showdown), Scott Sonneborn (Beavis and Butt-Head and Undergrads), and even former creators like Phil Walsh (Teamo Supremo) and Van Partible (Johnny Bravo).

Reception

Ratings
The debut of the pilot episode on Toon Disney's Jetix block was its "most-watched original animated series premiere ever". The series continued to garner high ratings on the block afterwards, tying for first place on average.

In Europe, Yin Yang Yo! was the third-most popular Jetix original series for third-party sales as of fiscal year 2007, when the first season was delivered. Yin Yang Yo! and the major Jetix Europe originals ranked "as one of the top two shows in their timeslots in all of the markets in which they aired."

Reviews
Common Sense Media had a mixed opinion of the show, giving it a score of 3/5. The pilot was poorly received by The New York Times.

Awards

Details

External links

 
 

Yin Yang Yo!
2000s American animated television series
2000s American comic science fiction television series
2000s American satirical television series
2000s Canadian animated television series
2000s Canadian comic science fiction television series
2000s Canadian satirical television series
2006 American television series debuts
2006 Canadian television series debuts
2009 American television series endings
2009 Canadian television series endings
American children's animated action television series
American children's animated adventure television series
American children's animated drama television series
American children's animated comic science fiction television series
American children's animated science fantasy television series
American flash animated television series
Animated television series about orphans
Animated television series about rabbits and hares
Animated television series about siblings
Animated television series about twins
Anime-influenced Western animated television series
Canadian children's animated action television series
Canadian children's animated adventure television series
Canadian children's animated drama television series
Canadian children's animated comic science fiction television series
Canadian children's animated science fantasy television series
Canadian flash animated television series
Television series by Disney Television Animation
Disney XD original programming
English-language television shows
Jetix original programming
Martial arts television series
Television series by Disney
Television series created by Bob Boyle